The Church of St Mary Magdalene in Great Elm, Somerset, England, dates from the 12th century and is a Grade I listed building.

In the 13th century the two-bay nave was lengthened, possibly when the tower was added around 1240. The chancel was widened around the same period. Some of the Romanesque fabric of the original Norman building can be seen despite the remodelling in the early 17th century. The walls show herringbone pattern masonry. The three-stage tower has corner buttresses and a saddleback roof.

Some of the box pews are Jacobean, and there is a 17th-century pulpit. The West end has  an imitation Jacobean gallery formerly used by the choir and organ. 

The parish is part of the benefice of Mells with Buckland Dinham, Elm, Whatley and Chantry within the Diocese of Bath and Wells.

See also

 List of Grade I listed buildings in Mendip
 List of towers in Somerset
 List of ecclesiastical parishes in the Diocese of Bath and Wells

References

Grade I listed churches in Somerset
Church of England church buildings in Mendip District
12th-century church buildings in England
Grade I listed buildings in Mendip District